Shott is an unincorporated community in Grundy County, in the U.S. state of Missouri.

History
A post office called Shott was established in 1884, and remained in operation until 1902. William Shott, an early postmaster, gave the community his last name.

References

Unincorporated communities in Grundy County, Missouri
Unincorporated communities in Missouri